SS (RMS) Tynwald (I), No. 21921, was an iron paddle-steamer which served with the Isle of Man Steam Packet Company, and was the first vessel in the Company to bear the name.

History
The Isle of Man Steam Packet Company's first Tynwald was built by the Robert Napier and Sons of Glasgow, in 1846. She has the dubious distinction of being the first Steam Packet vessel whose launch was delayed by a strike in the shipbuilding yard - as reported by the directors in 1846. The first, but by no means the last.

Tynwald was a reliable ship. A local newspaper described her as being 'as sure as a mountain goat'.

The fastest ship of her day, Tynwald recorded  on her sea trials.

Upon her completion, she was taken under the command of the Commodore of the Line, Captain William Gill and made passage to Douglas in a time of 12hrs.

The arrival of the Tynwald was celebrated in the Mona's Herald:-

On Thursday 31 December 1846, when on charter to the Liverpool and Belfast Company and under the command of Captain William Gill, she collided with the Admiralty Steam Vessel Urgent and damaged a paddle box. The collision occurred in the River Mersey, in the vicinity of the Formby Lightship. Captain Gill was exonerated by the directors: the accident occurred in dense fog. It is noted in the Company minutes, that a provision of £386 (equivalent to £ in ) was to be set aside to meet repairs to the damage suffered by the vessel. This did not prevent the directors from later claiming £2,004 (equivalent to £ in ) in compensation for damage and loss of earnings, and then, on legal advice, settling for £1,489. On 22 February 1848, she collided with the brig William. One of the vessels lost her bowsprit, jib-boom and bulwarks. On 21 December 1854, she struck steps at the Prince's Pier, Liverpool, severely damaging her starboard paddle box and forcing the cancellation of her sailing to the Isle of Man. In December 1863, she was in collision with the Naval brig Wild Wave, the settlement after a long wrangle costing the Steam Packet £1,128 (equivalent to £ in ).

Layout
Tynwald was rigged as a barquentine, with a clipper bow. She had three masts, with the funnel abaft of the paddle boxes. A conspicuous feature was a full length figurehead of a Manx Scandinavian king in armour.

Service
Tynwald operated the passenger and cargo service between Liverpool and the Island of Man. After 1863, she was only used as cargo vessel.

During the winter season in 1850, she was chartered to go to the Mediterranean and called at Gibraltar, Genoa and Leghorn, making the round trip in 30 days.

Disposal
After an eventful career of 20 years, she was sold to Caird & Company for £5,000 (equivalent to £ in ) in part payment for her successor, Tynwald (II).

Footnotes

References
Bibliography
 Chappell, Connery (1980). Island Lifeline T.Stephenson & Sons Ltd 

Ships of the Isle of Man Steam Packet Company
1846 ships
Ferries of the Isle of Man
Passenger ships of the United Kingdom
Steamships
Paddle steamers of the United Kingdom
Steamships of the United Kingdom
Merchant ships of the United Kingdom
Maritime incidents in December 1846
Ships built on the River Clyde
Maritime incidents in December 1863
Maritime incidents in February 1848
Maritime incidents in December 1854